The Suvorov Military Schools are a type of boarding school in the former Soviet Union and in modern Russia and Belarus for boys of 10–17. Education in these schools focuses on military related subjects. The schools are named after Alexander Suvorov, a well-known 18th century general.

Their naval counterparts among Russian military schools are the Nakhimov Naval Schools. They are named after Pavel Nakhimov, the 19th century admiral.

History
The Suvorov and Nakhimov school models were created during the Second World War in December 1943 to provide boys of school age, particularly those from families of military personnel, with a secondary education specializing in military (army, navy, intelligence, etc.) subjects and training. Boarding school aspect was particularly important at the time because many students were war orphans, who were either without parents or with only a surviving mother, unable to support them. A number still exist in Russia and the former Soviet Union. Other schools have existed in other Soviet republics. The former Kiev Suvorov Military School in Ukraine was reorganized in 1992 and named after Ivan Bohun in 1998. In July 1991, the Cabinet of Ministers of the USSR signed an order making the Bishkek Suvorov Military School and the Ulyanovsk Guards Suvorov Military School. Although the school in Ulyanovsk was created, the Bishkek branch was not created due to the collapse of the USSR. Carey Schofield, a British journalist with close links to the Soviet Armed Forces, wrote in 1990–91, 'it is still generally accepted that the best way for an officer to start his career is to attend one of the very smart Suvorov or Nakhimov schools, the military boarding schools.'

Republican Special Boarding Schools

Republican Special Boarding Schools are military schools that were created in the early 1980s on the basis of the Suvorov Military Schools. They were subordinate to the Ministry of Education of the USSR. 

After the collapse of the USSR, the military lyceums/high schools in the newly formed countries in the Commonwealth of Independent States were nationalized and came under the auspices of the local defense ministries.

Role
The Suvorov schools in Russia are now subordinate to the Commander-in-Chief of the Russian Ground Forces, with schools operating in cities such as Tambov, Ekaterinburg, and Kazan.

Traditions

Corps of Drums 
The Moscow Military Music College, which is a spin-off of the Suvorov Military School whose mission is to train future Rususan military musicians, is known for its Corps of Drums.

Suvorovite military culture 
The Military Lyceum of the Ministry of Defense of Tajikistan and the Kyrgyz State National Military Lyceum are often referred to as the "Suvorov School". In 2020, during the first Turkmen Victory Parade at the Halk Hakydasy Memorial Complex, the students of Berdimuhamed Annayev 1st Specialized Military School wore the traditional full dress uniforms of the Suvorov Military Schools.

Active schools in Russia

Under MoD

Under the MVD

Active schools outside of Russia 

Outside of the Russian Federation, there are two Suvorov Schools operating as of 2020: one each in Minsk (Belarus), and Tiraspol (Transnistria). The Minsk Suvorov Military School was established in the former building of the United Belarusian Military School on 21 May 1952. The Tiraspol Suvorov Military School is located in the partially recognized Pridnestrovian Moldavian Republic, being established on 1 September 2017.

Former Soviet era schools 
 Voronezh Suvorov Military School
 Kuibyshev Suvorov Military School
 Kiev Suvorov Military School
 Saratov Suvorov Military school
 Stavropol Suvorov Military School
 Stalingrad Suvorov Military School
 Tambov Suvorov Military School
 Leningrad Suvorov Military School (under the MVD)
 Tashkent Suvorov Military School (under the MVD)

See also
 Nakhimov Naval School
 Cantonist

External sources
Harriet F. Scott and William F. Scott, Russian Military Directory 2004, pp. 207–208
Association of Suvorov Military Schools

References

Suvorov Military School
Military education and training in Russia
Military education and training in the Soviet Union
Military high schools
Boarding schools in Russia
Alexander Suvorov
Military education and training in Belarus
Schools in Belarus